Physical Geography is a bimonthly peer-reviewed scientific journal covering all aspects of physical geography. It was established in 1980 and is published by Taylor & Francis. It was originally published by Bellwether Publishing until the start of the 34th volume in 2013, when it moved to Taylor & Francis. The editor-in-chief is Chris Houser (University of Windsor). According to the Journal Citation Reports, the journal has a 2021 impact factor of 2.075.

References

External links

Geography journals
Physical geography
Taylor & Francis academic journals
Bimonthly journals
Publications established in 1980
English-language journals